PEK may refer to:

 IATA code for Beijing Capital International Airport
 Polyetherketones, an engineering plastic
 Pomeranian Evangelical Church (Pommersche Evangelische Kirche), a Protestant church in Mecklenburg-Western Pomerania, Germany
 Program for Evaluating Complementary Medicine, the English translation of Programme Evaluation Komplementärmedizin (PEK)
 Phantom Evil King, a boss in the video game Okage

See also
 Pek (disambiguation)